Bayview Heights is a southern suburb of Cairns in the Cairns Region, Queensland, Australia.

History 
Bayview Heights is situated in the Yidinji traditional Aboriginal country.  The area was aptly named Bayview in 1947 based on views of the sea.  The name Bayview Heights was implemented in April 1970. 

In the 2011 census, Bayview Heights had a population of 4,150 people.

References

Further reading

External links 
 University of Queensland: Queensland Places: Cairns Suburbs

Suburbs of Cairns